Karen Russell (born July 10, 1981) is an American novelist and short story writer. Her debut novel, Swamplandia!, was a finalist for the  2012 Pulitzer Prize for Fiction. In 2009 the National Book Foundation named Russell a 5 under 35 honoree. She was also the recipient of a MacArthur Foundation "Genius Grant" in 2013.

Early life
After graduating from Coral Gables Senior High School in Miami, Florida in 1999, Russell received a BA in Spanish from Northwestern University in 2003. She graduated from the MFA program at Columbia University in 2006. A Miami native, as of 2019 she resides in Portland, Oregon, with her husband, editor Tony Perez, and two children. Her brother, Kent Russell, is also a writer.

Career and awards 
Russell's stories have been featured in The Best American Short Stories, Conjunctions, Granta, The New Yorker, Oxford American, and Zoetrope.

She was named a National Book Foundation "5 Under 35" young writer honoree at the November 2009 ceremony for her first short story collection, St. Lucy's Home for Girls Raised by Wolves, for which Russell won the Bard Fiction Prize in 2011.

Russell's second book and first novel, Swamplandia!, about a family of alligator wrestlers and their shabby amusement park in the Everglades was long-listed for the 2011 Orange Prize. The novel was also included in The New York Times' "10 Best Books of 2011" and won the New York Public Library's 2012 Young Lions Fiction Award. Swamplandia! was a finalist for the 2012 Pulitzer Prize for Fiction; however, none of the three finalists received enough votes, and no prize was awarded.

Russell's second collection of short stories, Vampires in the Lemon Grove, was published by Vintage Contemporaries in February 2013. Her third short story collection, Orange World and Other Stories, was released in May 2019.

Her short story "The Hox River Window," published in Zoetrope: All-Story, won the 2012 National Magazine Award for fiction. She is the recipient of the Mary Ellen von der Heyden Berlin Prize and was awarded a fellowship at the American Academy in Berlin for Spring 2012. "Reeling for the Empire" won the Shirley Jackson Award for Best Novelette of 2012. In 2013, Russell received a MacArthur Foundation "Genius Grant."

In 2010 Russell spent time as a visiting writer at the Iowa Writers' Workshop. She later served as an artist in residence at Yaddo in Saratoga Springs, NY. In Fall 2013, Russell was a distinguished guest teacher of creative writing in the MFA program at Rutgers University-Camden.

Russell has been the Endowed Chair in Creative Writing at Texas State University’s MFA program since 2017.

Bibliography

Novels

Short fiction 
Collections
 
 
 
Stories

Non-fiction

See also
 Proving Up (opera)

References

External links

 Random House Author Page
 2011 podcast interview at The Bat Segundo Show
"A Conversation with Karen Russell about her first novel, Swamplandia!", BookBrowse
"Interview with Karen Russell: Author of St. Lucy's Home For Girls Raised By Wolves", In the Labyrinth, June 16, 2010
"20 Under 40: Q. & A.Karen Russell", The New Yorker, June 14, 2010

Short Stories
Haunting Olivia
ZZ's Sleep-Away Camp for Disordered Dreamers by Karen Russell
The Graveless Doll of Eric Mutis

1981 births
Living people
21st-century American novelists
21st-century American short story writers
21st-century American women writers
American fantasy writers
American women novelists
American women short story writers
Columbia University School of the Arts alumni
MacArthur Fellows
Northwestern University alumni
The New Yorker people
Women science fiction and fantasy writers
Writers from Miami
Novelists from Florida